Gräfelfing is a municipality in the district of Munich, in Bavaria, Germany. It is located 1 km west of Munich.

The name "Gräfelfing" first appears as "Grevolvinga", which as per one hypothesis could possibly name a tribe leader named "grey wolf" ("*Grevol" -> German "grau(er)" -> English "grey"; "*vinga" -> German "Wolf" -> English "wolf").

Gräfelfing is ranked 5th of the wealthiest municipalities in Germany (2021).

Transport
Both are served by the Munich S-Bahn.

References

Munich (district)